Dasun Madushan (born 2 February 1996) is a Sri Lankan singer. He is the winner of the fifth season of Sirasa Superstar.

Early life 
He studied at Prince of Wales' College, Moratuwa. His father is Karunarathne Wickramasinghe, a retired policeman, and his mother is Rohini Jayalath, a housewife. He studied G.C.E Advanced Level in Art subjects in school, and he was the stage announcer of Sirasa Superstar season 6 – Hayawana Katahada (6th voice).

Music life 
Madushan participated in Shihan Mihiranga Bennet's group in the contest. Some songs performed by him, such as "Sinhayo", "Menik Apsaravi", "Pransha Yuwathiyan", "As deka Piyaana" were well received.

His first song is the Swapna theme song, which he sang with Sirasa Superstar season 3 winner Shanika Madumali. He later debuted his first solo songs "Ansathu Wee" and "Mage As Walin".

References

External links 
 Reverbnation.com
 Sarasaviya.lk
 Sirasa.lk
 Dasun Madushan Songs

1996 births
Living people
Sinhalese singers
21st-century Sri Lankan male singers